Dorji Dema (born October 16, 1983) is an athlete from Bhutan who competes in archery.

At the 2008 Summer Olympics in Beijing Dema finished her ranking round with a total of 567 points. This gave her the 61st seed for the final competition bracket in which she faced Khatuna Narimanidze in the first round. The archer from Georgia was too strong and won the confrontation with 107-97, eliminating Dema straight away.

References

External links
 

1983 births
Living people
People from Thimphu
Olympic archers of Bhutan
Archers at the 2008 Summer Olympics
Bhutanese female archers
Archers at the 1998 Asian Games
Archers at the 2002 Asian Games
Archers at the 2006 Asian Games
Asian Games competitors for Bhutan